Félix Brillant (born September 9, 1980 in Brossard, Quebec) is a Canadian former soccer player.

Career

Youth and Amateur
Brillant began his career in the youth system of French team AS Cannes, but never appeared for the senior side. He returned to North America in 2002, and played college soccer for at Franklin Pierce College in the NCAA Division II, where he was named All-New England Region four times.

In 2002 and 2003 he also played for Cape Cod Crusaders in the USL Premier Development League, with whom he won back-to-back PDL championships.

Professional
Brillant was drafted 56th overall by the New England Revolution in the 2004 MLS Superdraft and scored a goal in the 2004 season for the Revs, but was released in June 2005 without making an appearance that season.

Brillant played for the Virginia Beach Mariners in the USL First Division in 2005 and 2006, and then played midfield for Sparta Sarpsborg of the Adeccoligaen in 2007.

On July 30, 2008, Brillant signed a contract with the Montreal Impact of the United Soccer League. During the 2008 season Brillant helped the team move up in the USL First Division standings. In 11 games, including four starts, Brillant tallied five points, all on August 24, in a 3-1 win against Atlanta Silverbacks. He also took part in six of the eight games that the Impact played in the CONCACAF Champions League.

On December 2, 2008 the Montreal Impact announced the re-signing of Brillant to a two-year contract. During the 2009 USL season Brillant contributed by helping the Impact clinch a playoff spot under new head coach Marc Dos Santos. He helped the Impact reach the finals where Montreal would face the Vancouver Whitecaps, this marking the first time in USL history where the final match would consist of two Canadian clubs. In the final Brillant helped the Impact win the series 6-3 on aggregate. The victory gave the Impact their third USL Championship and also the victory marked Brillant's first USL Championship. On November 30, 2009, Brillant was released by the Impact, and joined the reserve team Trois-Rivières Attak in the Canadian Soccer League.

International
Brillant played for the Canadian national U-17 team in the late 1990s. He was on the bench for Canada’s FIFA World Cup Qualifier against Guatemala on 13 October 2004, but did not play in the game.

Honors

Cape Cod Crusaders
USL Premier Development League Champions (1): 2003

References

External links
Montreal Impact bio

1980 births
Living people
AS Cannes players
Black Canadian soccer players
Canadian expatriate sportspeople in the United States
Canadian expatriate soccer players
Canadian expatriate sportspeople in France
Canadian expatriate sportspeople in Norway
Canadian soccer players
Cape Cod Crusaders players
Expatriate footballers in France
Expatriate footballers in Norway
Expatriate soccer players in the United States
Association football midfielders
Franklin Pierce University alumni
Haitian Quebecers
Haitian emigrants to Canada
Major League Soccer players
Naturalized citizens of Canada
New England Revolution players
Soccer people from Quebec
People from Brossard
Sarpsborg 08 FF players
USL First Division players
Virginia Beach Mariners players
Canadian Soccer League (1998–present) players
USL League Two players
Montreal Impact (1992–2011) players
Trois-Rivières Attak players
Canada men's youth international soccer players
New England Revolution draft picks